Harpalus frater is a species of ground beetle in the subfamily Harpalinae. It was described by Chaudoir in 1876.

References

frater
Beetles described in 1876